Macau is competing at the 2013 World Aquatics Championships in Barcelona, Spain between 19 July and 4 August 2013.

Diving

Macau qualified five quota places for the following diving events.

Men

Women

Swimming

Macanese swimmers achieved qualifying standards in the following events (up to a maximum of 2 swimmers in each event at the A-standard entry time, and 1 at the B-standard):

Men

Women

Synchronized swimming

Macau has qualified twelve synchronized swimmers.

References

External links
Barcelona 2013 Official Site

Nations at the 2013 World Aquatics Championships
2013 in Macau sport
Macau at the World Aquatics Championships